Tricarbon (systematically named 1λ2,3λ2-propadiene and catena-tricarbon) is an inorganic compound with the chemical formula  (also written [C(μ-C)C] or ). It is a colourless gas that only persists in dilution or solution as an adduct. It is one of the simplest unsaturated carbenes. Tricarbon can be found in interstellar space and can be produced in the laboratory by a process called laser ablation.

Natural occurrence 
Tricarbon is a small carbon cluster first spectroscopically observed in the early 20th century in the tail of a comet by William Huggins and subsequently identified in stellar atmospheres. Small carbon clusters like tricarbon and dicarbon are regarded as soot precursors and are implicated in the formation of certain industrial diamonds and in the formation of fullerenes.

C3 has also been identified as a transient species in various combustion reactions.

Properties

Chemical properties 
The chemical properties of C3 was investigated in the 1960s by Professor Emeritus Philip S. Skell of Pennsylvania State University, who showed that certain reactions of carbon vapor indicated its generation, such as the reaction with isobutylene to produce 1,1,1',1'-tetramethyl-bis-ethanoallene.

Physical properties 
The ground state molecular geometry of tricarbon has been identified as linear via its characteristic symmetric and antisymmetric stretching and bending vibrational modes and bears bond lengths of 129 to 130 picometer corresponding to those of alkenes. The ionization potential is determined experimentally at 11 to 13.5 electronvolts. In contrast to the linear tricarbon molecule, the  cation is bent.

Nomenclature 

The systematic names 1λ2,3λ2-propadiene, and μ-carbidodicarbon, valid IUPAC names, are constructed according to the substitutive and additive nomenclatures, respectively.

In appropriate contexts, tricarbon can be viewed as propadiene with four hydrogen atoms removed, or as propane with eight hydrogen atoms removed; and as such, propadienediylidene or propanetetraylidene, respectively, may be used as a context-specific systematic names, according to substitutive nomenclature. By default, these names pay no regard to the radicality of the tricarbon molecule. In even more specific context, these can also name the non-radical singlet state, whereas the diradical state is named propadienediylylidene, or propanediyldiylidene, and the tetraradical state is named propedienetetrayl or propanetetraylylidene.

See also 

Hydrocarbons
Alkenes
List of molecules in interstellar space
Cyclopropatriene

References

Further reading 

Astrochemistry
Allotropes of carbon
Homonuclear triatomic molecules